John Downer (born 1952) is a British film producer of nature documentaries for television and cinema. He is best known for his contributions to the nature documentary series BBC Wildlife Specials.

Education and career 
John Downer was born in 1952 in London. He studied zoology at Swansea University. He started his professional life in 1981 at the BBC Natural History Unit, later creating his own production company John Downer Productions headquartered in Bristol. Downer pioneered a number of techniques for wildlife filmmaking, in particular by putting cameras on birds, and by filming birds from the air using various airborne filming platforms.

Film and television credits
 1988: Supersense, six-part series
 1991: Lifesense, six-part series
 1992: Digging in the Dirt, music video for Peter Gabriel, awarded a Grammy
 1999: Supernatural: The Unseen Powers of Animals, six-part series
 2000: Lions - Spy in the Den, part of BBC Wildlife Specials
 2002: Weird Nature, six-part series
 2003: Elephants - Spy in the Herd, part of BBC Wildlife Specials
 2004: Bears - Spy in the Woods, part of BBC Wildlife Specials
 2004: Pride, feature-length documentary
 2007: Trek - Spy on the Wildebeest, part of BBC Wildlife Specials
 2008: Tiger - Spy in the Jungle, three-part series, part of BBC Wildlife Specials
 2009: Swarm, two-part series
 2010: Polar Bear - Spy on the Ice, part of BBC Wildlife Specials
 2010: Psyche, music video for Massive Attack
 2011: Earthflight, six-part series
 2013: Penguins - Spy in the Huddle, three-part series, part of BBC Wildlife Specials
 2014: Dolphins - Spy in the Pod, part of BBC Wildlife Specials
 2017: Spy in the Wild
 2019: Serengeti, six-part series

References

External links
 
 John Downer Productions

1950s births
Alumni of Swansea University
British television producers
Nature television producers
Grammy Award winners
Living people